According to the Torah or Law of Moses, these are some of the offenses which may merit the death penalty.

Religious practices
 Sacrificing to gods other than Yahweh
 Anyone who "giveth of his seed unto Molech"
 Worshipping Baal Peor. The death penalty here was specifically impalement.
 A prophet who says to follow gods other than Yahweh
 A person who follows gods other than Yahweh 
 A false prophet, one whose prophecies do not come to pass
 Necromancy, according to the Masoretic Text; specifically those who are masters over ghosts (Hebrew: Ba'al ob) and those who gain information from the dead (Hebrew: Yidde'oni). The Septuagint instead condemns gastromancy (Greek: eggastrimuthos), and enchantment (Greek: epaoidos).
 According to the Masoretic Text, practitioners of kashaph – incanting maleficium. According to the Septuagint version of the same passages, pharmakeia – poisoners; drug users for the purposes of hallucinogenic experiences. Historically this passage has been translated into English using vague terminology, condemning witchcraft (or sorcery) in general.
 Blaspheming Yahweh
 Working on the Sabbath
 A non-Levite ("common man") who gets close to the tabernacle

Sexual practices
 Being either participant in consensual sexual activity, in which a betrothed woman consensually loses her virginity to another man
 Rape by a man of a betrothed woman in the countryside
 Adultery with a married woman. Both parties are to die.
 A woman falsely representing herself as a virgin before the marriage ceremony
 Marrying one's wife's mother. This was in addition to one's wife; death is by burning.
 Certain forms of incest, namely if it involves the father's wife or a daughter-in-law. Other forms of incest receive lesser punishment; sexual activity with a sister/stepsister is given excommunication for a punishment; if it involves a brother's wife or an uncle's wife it is just cursed and sexual activity with an aunt that is a blood relation is merely criticised.
 Certain sexual activities between males (Hebrew: zakhar) involving what the Masoretic Text literally terms lie lyings (of a) woman (Hebrew: tishkav mishkvei ishah), and the Septuagint literally terms beds [verb] the woman's/wife's bed (Greek: koimethese koiten gynaikos); the gender of the target of the command is commonly understood to be male, but not explicitly stated. The correct translation and interpretation of this passage, and its implications for homosexuality in Judaism and homosexuality in Christianity, are controversial. Translations into English are wide-ranging.
 Bestiality. Both the human and the animal are to die.
 Prostitution by the daughter of a priest

Homicide
 Murder, believed by Jews to apply to non-Jews as well. Sanctuary at the altar was not permitted.
 If an ox has gored in the past and the owner has been warned about the behavior of the ox but has failed to confine it and it gores and kills another person the owner is put to death. If the interested party requires payment of a fee death is not required. If a slave is killed the owner of the ox is to pay a fine, and the ox is to be stoned in all cases. However, Exodus 21:28 mandates that the ox be stoned for the first offense of goring.

Parental discipline
 Smiting a parent
 Cursing a parent
 A son who persists in disobeying his parents

Courts
 Disobeying the decision of the court
 False witness to a capital crime

Kidnapping
 "Stealing" an Israelite into slavery.

See also
 613 commandments
 Capital punishment in Judaism
 Capital punishment
 Christian views on the Old Covenant
 Crime and punishment in the Bible
 Death penalty in the Bible
 Draco (lawgiver)
 Jewish ethics
 Religion and capital punishment
 Sanhedrin
 Seven Laws of Noah
 Twelve Tables
 Witchcraft and divination in the Hebrew Bible

References

External links
 Jewish Encyclopedia: Capital Punishment
 Catholic Encyclopedia: Capital Punishment

Capital punishment
Crime
Judaism and capital punishment
Old Testament-related lists
Torah